Ugly Beauty is the fourteenth studio album by Taiwanese singer Jolin Tsai. It was released on December 26, 2018, by Sony and Eternal. It was produced by Tsai with Razor Chiang, Starr Chen, Howe Chen, and Øzi. Musically, it is a pop record which merged a series of genres such as trap, house, reggae, and gothic rock. Thematically, it tends to break through the traditional aesthetic criterion and explore the bipolarity of human feeling, and Tsai wants to "uncover the ugliness hidden behind the perfect surface, and peek into the emotions that try the best to be buried" through the album.

The album received generally positive reviews from music critics, who commented the concept is unified and complete, singing condition is comfortable and freehand, and it was considered the leading production in the C-pop music industry. The album became the highest-selling album of 2019 in Taiwan. It became the highest-selling digital album by a Hong Kong/Taiwanese female artist of all time in China, and it made Tsai the highest-selling digital Hong Kong/Taiwanese female artist of all time in the country. In September 2022, the album's digital sales crossed the 800,000 mark in China.

The album received a total of eight Golden Melody Award nominations. The album was nominated for Album of the Year, Best Mandarin Album, and Best Vocal Recording Album, "Womxnly" was nominated for Song of the Year, the music video of "Ugly Beauty" and "Lady in Red" were nominated for Best Music Video, Tsai was nominated for Best Female Mandarin Singer, and Tsai together with Starr Chen were nominated for Best Single Producer for "Ugly Beauty". The album eventually won Album of the Year, and "Womxnly" won Song of the Year. To further promote the album, she embarked on her fifth concert tour Ugly Beauty World Tour on December 30, 2019 and it concluded on January 8, 2023.

Background 

On November 15, 2014, Tsai released her thirteenth studio album, Play. It sold more than 85,000 copies in Taiwan, becoming the year's highest-selling album by a female singer and the year's fourth highest-selling album overall in the country. The album earned a total of 10 Golden Melody Award nominations, and it is one of the three most nominated albums in the awards' history. Eventually, it won Best Mandarin Album and Best Vocal Recording Album. In support of the album, Tsai embarked on her fourth concert tour, Play World Tour. The tour started on May 22, 2015 in Taipei, Taiwan at Taipei Arena and continued before concluding on July 16, 2016 in Kuala Lumpur, Malaysia at Stadium Merdeka.

On September 30, 2016, she collaborated with Alesso and released the single, "I Wanna Know". On October 31, 2016, Tsai collaborated with Starr Chen and released the single, "Ego-Holic". In 2017, Tsai released a series of single, including "Give Love" for the 2017 Mother's Day and a related public interest campaign held by Taiwanese charity organization Tzu Chi Foundation, "We Are One" collaborated with Hardwell, "On Happiness Road" for the 2018 Taiwanese animated film of the same title, and "Stand Up" for the 2018 Chinese film, Monster Hunt 2. In January 2018, Tsai released the live video album, Play World Tour, which chronicled the Play World Tour and was filmed at Taipei Arena during the Taipei dates of the tour on May 22–25, 2015. On June 12, 2018, Tsai released the single "The Player" for the video game, Dungeon & Fighter.

Development 
On July 26, 2016, Tsai announced that she was ready to get started on her next album. On November 12, 2016, Tsai revealed on Instagram that the names of songwriters Hayley Aitken, Olof Lindskog, and Johan Moraeus with photos of them working in recording studio of label The Kennel in Stockholm, Sweden. On July 18, 2016, Tsai's manager Tom Wang confirmed that Tsai devoted herself to the album and it would be Tsai's most expensive album ever made, with a budget of over NT$100 million. Wang also revealed that Tsai has formed the team independently to create songs and music videos and she would form the team to promote the album. On July 20, 2017, Tsai revealed that she had invited Ashin to collaborate on the album. On the same date, Tsai said: "So far around eight demos have been collected, but we are encountering problems in rewriting the lyrics until the songwriters could get the correct sentiment I want. This time I am listening to my body, if the demo conveys me a sense of excitement, then it's right." On September 11, 2017, Tsai confirmed that two songs had been recorded but the album were significantly behind in progress.

On March 1, 2018, Tsai revealed on Instagram that the names of songwriters Richard Craker, Stan Dubb, Rhys Fletcher, and Alex Sypsomos with images of the group working in Karma Sound Studios in Pattaya, Thailand. On March 14, 2018, Tsai said that she has started to determine the lead single. On May 15, 2018, Tsai talked to Nylon and confirmed that eleven demos had been collected and four songs had been recorded. Tsai also said that she was currently reading books related to neuroscience, psychology, and Zhuangzi, and she described the album should be “the most honest album”. Tsai revealed that the album would have a wide range of music styles, which include genres she had never attempted before. On June 12, 2018, Tsai's manager Tom Wang revealed that her album were already fifty percent complete and it would be released by the end of the year. On June 24, 2018, Tsai talked to QQ Music's Big Star Show and confirmed that she had written some songs for the album. On September 12, 2018, Tsai's manager Tom Wang confirmed that Tsai has started to prepare for shooting music videos. On October 4, 2018, Tsai's manager Tom Wang confirmed that Tsai would finish recording for her album in the same month, with its release scheduled in December of the year, and she would begin to shoot the album's cover art and music videos in the next month. On November 12, 2018, Tsai confirmed through Sina Weibo that she had finished recording the album.

Writing and recording 

"Ugly Beauty" has trap, hip hop, and drum & bass influences. It is an uptempo dance song where Tsai responds positively to all the criticisms that were being said, with lyrics such as: "If you can't see my beauty, you must be blind." "Hubby" is a upbeat dance song with heavy backing vocals to enhance the lively atmosphere. Tsai said: "I hope this song could be everybody's wedding march." "Womxnly" was inspired by the story of Yeh Yung-chih. It speaks about regardless of gender there is no established framework for gender identity, and Tsai has been constantly paid attention to human rights campaigns, including LGBT rights and same-sex marriage. Tsai said: "People do not have to live in the established framework of society, a boy has femininity doesn't necessarily mean a bad thing, and masculinity is not every boy desires to have." Musically, it merged the genres of tropical house and dancehall, featuring instrumentation from Southeast Asia's musical instruments.

"Life Sucks" is a future bass song. Tsai used a lazy vocal timbre to speak about the negative aspect of one's personality, and she said: "This song talks about the things you don't want to do but have to face in life. We can only tell ourselves that the negativity will eventually leave us." "Lady in Red" was described as "a sense of ghost story", it contains pop sounds and mumble rap influences, and Tsai sings in a deeper tone. "Karma" is a reggaeton song talking about break-up and ex-lover, and Tsai described that the song accompanies the black humorous style of lyrics delivers the message of "living well is the best revenge". "Romance" is a ballad talking about the reality of modern love relationships. With its classic piano sound and electronic melody, Tsai sings over the tune consisting of gothic rock and urban R&B. Tsai said: "Sometimes romance is established, as all the fairy tales go, the princess and the prince get married and lead a happy life ever since, but nobody tells us what will happen after marriage."

"Sweet Guilty Pleasure" speaks about love game and incorporated bounce beats. Tsai said: "Knowing your body is also knowing your own desires, the society has to tell everybody such concept, so people will not hurt others due to curiosity." "Necessarily Evil" incorporated hardcore hip hop with trap and gothic rock styles, it also accompanies "devil's voices", shouting sounds, and synths. Tsai used a deeper vocal register to intone the lyrics to express sense of conflict between repression and emancipation, and the lyrics carry a message of being fearless of the evil in inner world. Tsai said: "I want to use this song to tell everybody it's horrible to enter into your inner world, but it will become not that evil when you're ready to face it." A 1960s inspired rock and roll and soul music formed the backbone of "Vulnerability", where Tsai sings about what should be the real courage in love relationships. "Shadow Self" is a slow-paced alternative R&B song features the sounds that often appear in Tsai's dreams. Inspired by Carl Jung's psychological term "shadow", the song was written through live instruments and musical improvisation in the studio. Tsai said: "Dream is a spiritual journey of loneliness, and I believe in the words the subconscious wants to tell me."

Artwork and packaging 
On November 27, 2018, Tsai released the cover art of the album's pre-order limited edition and the first series of promotional artworks for the album, which were shot by Chinese photographer Zhong Lin and directed by Malaysian stylist Yii Ooi. The artworks themed "The Mouth of Truth" depicts the singer making strange gesture and weak eyes with an exaggerated lips-shaped adornment, and they convey the message of breaking the conventional concept of beauty and ugliness.

On December 14, 2018, Tsai released the cover art of the album's standard edition and the second series of promotional artworks, which were shot by Taiwanese photographer Icura Chiang and directed by Hong Kong stylists Tungus Chan and Matthew Chan. The artworks features the singer with wet hair in a black strapless bodysuit and a suit jacket designed by British fashion designer Gareth Pugh, and they intend to remind people to aware the existence and benefit of negative emotions.

Inspired by the Greek myth story of "Pandora's Box", the package of the album's standard edition was designed by Taiwanese designer Yen Po-chun, who described the myth story which exhorts people to have hope is well suited the album's theme of exploring the good and evil of human nature. The package of the album's pre-order limited edition used cloth box, and the edition presents a 200-page photo diary with four different cover arts.

Release and promotion 
On December 4, 2018, Tsai held a pre-order promotional event in Taipei, Taiwan. On December 5, 2018, the pre-order edition of the album, which only limited to 10,000 copies, was available for pre-order at Taiwan's 7-Eleven stores and record stores. The pre-order which started at midnight lasted only for less than one minute within which all the available units were sold out. On December 26, 2018, Tsai held a press conference for the album release in Beijing, China. On January 20 and 27, 2019, Tsai held two signing sessions in Taipei and Kaohsiung, Taiwan. On May 18, 2019, Tsai held a music sharing session for Ugly Beauty at Baosteel Gymnasium in Shanghai, China.

On its first date of release, it became Spotify's one-day most streamed album of all time in Taiwan. On March 8, 2019, Spotify unveiled Tsai the most streamed female artist of all time in Taiwan. On December 3, 2019, Spotify announced the "2019 Wrapped", the album reached the second most listened album of the year in Taiwan, and Tsai became the third most listened singer, the most listened female singer, and the second most listened Taiwanese singer of the year in Taiwan. The digital album peaked at number one in China, Cambodia, Hong Kong, Macau, Malaysia, Philippines, Singapore, and Taiwan, number three in Vietnam, number eight in Chile, number 10 in Turkey, number 19 in Thailand, and also appeared on the chart of Australia, Brazil, Ireland, Japan, Mexico, Netherlands, New Zealand, and Russia. It became the second highest-selling digital album by a female artist of the year in China, with total sales of more than 220,000 copies in China within six days as of December 2018. The following year, it became the highest-selling digital album by a Hong Kong/Taiwanese female artist of all time in China, and it made Tsai the highest-selling digital Hong Kong/Taiwanese female artist of all time in the country. On February 5, 2020, the album's digital sales crossed the 500,000 mark in China.

With the rise of digital music, the physical format of the album was only released in Taiwan, and it peaked at number one on the album sales charts of Taiwanese record stores and online marketplaces, including Chia Chia, Eslite, Five Music, G-Music, Kuang Nan, PChome, and Pok'elai. In 2018, it reached number eight on the yearly album sales chart of Pok'elai, number three on Kuang Nan, number four on Chia Chia, number two on G-Music, number three on Five Music. As of March 1, 2019, it topped the albums sales charts of Chia Chia for five weeks, Five Music for nine weeks, G-Music for five weeks, Kuang Nan for eight weeks, and Pok'elai for three weeks. In 2019, it reached number three on the yearly album sales chart of Kuang Nan, number eight on Chia Chia, number one on G-Music, number five on Five Music. On December 7, 2020, Forbes reported that it was the highest-selling album of 2019 in Taiwan.

Live performances 
On December 31, 2018, Tsai attended the Jiangsu TV's New Year's Eve Concert and performed "Ugly Beauty". On January 5, 2019, Tsai appeared on the Taiwan TV's Chinese New Year special 2019 Super Star, which aired on February 4, 2019, and performed "Ugly Beauty" and "Womxnly". On January 26, 2019, Tsai performed "Sweet Guilty Pleasure", "Ugly Beauty", and "Hubby" on the 14th KKBox Music Awards. On April 5, 2019, Tsai performed "Ugly Beauty" on Youth with You together with Guan Yue, Jia Yi, Sun Zelin, Feng Junjie, and Lian Huiwei. On April 11, 2019, Tsai performed "Ugly Beauty" on the Singer 2019 together with Greeny Wu. On June 2, 2019, Tsai performed "Sweet Guilty Pleasure" and "Karma" on the 2019 Hito Music Awards.

On June 29, 2019, Tsai performed "Ugly Beauty" on the 30th Golden Melody Awards. On August 30, 2019, Tsai performed "Ugly Beauty" and "Womxnly" on the 2019 Global Chinese Song Chart Awards. On November 10, 2019, Tsai performed "Ugly Beauty" on the 2019 Suning Double 11 Gala. On December 14, 2019, Tsai performed "Ugly Beauty", "Womxnly", "Sweet Guilty Pleasure", and "Hubby" on the 13th Migu Music Awards. On December 23, 2019, Tsai appeared on the CCTV's New Year Gala, which aired on December 31, 2019, and performed "Ugly Beauty".

Singles 
On December 21, 2018, the lead single "Ugly Beauty" was released, and it debuted at number one in China, Malaysia, and Taiwan, number three in Hong Kong, number four in Singapore, and number nine in Philippines. On the same date, Tsai released the music video of "Ugly Beauty", which was directed by Muh Chen. With the concept of accepting what was and what is, Tsai responds positively to all the criticisms that were being said through the music video. With a budget of NT$15 million, it became the music video of the highest costs of her career to this date. The music video reached number one on the weekly most-wattched music videos charts of Bilibili, YinYueTai, and Taiwan's YouTube in the first week. The song topped the 2018 Hit FM Top 100 Singles of the Year chart, and it made Tsai become the artist who earned the most number-one songs on the chart. The song also debuted at number one on Billboard China Top 100, the Chinese equivalent to the US Billboard Hot 100. "Womxnly", "Sweet Guilty Pleasure", "Lady in Red", "Hubby", "Life Sucks", and "Karma" peaked at number seven, number 10, number 10, number 11, number 17, and number 20 on Billboard China Top 100, respectively.

Music videos 

On January 28, 2019, Tsai released the music video of "Hubby", which was directed by Jeff Chang. It was inspired by Hong Kong films of the 1980s, and it features Hong Kong actress Sandra Ng and Chinese actor Ryan Zheng. On February 15, 2019, Tsai released the music video of "Womxnly", which was directed by Ryan Parma. YouTube unveiled the it was the sixth most viewed music video of 2019 in Taiwan. On March 12, 2019, the music video of "Life Sucks", which was directed by Jeff Chang, was released. It topped the weekly charts of Bilibili and QQ Music in the first week of release.

On April 2, 2019, Tsai released the music video of "Lady in Red", which was directed by Cheng Wei-hao, and it features Taiwanese artists Dee Hsu and Edison Wang. It was premiered on the release date at Vieshow Cinema in Taipei, Taiwan in a one-night-only event. With a budget of NT$15 million, it topped the Bilibili and QQ Music charts in the first week of release. The Beijing News described it "changed the previous music videos which simply record singer's performance scenes simultaneously. It is like an inspiration to music video works in the music industry."

On May 9, 2019, Tsai released the music video of "Karma", which was directed by Remii Huang. It was inspired by an actual event around Kazuko Higa, the so-called "Queen of Anatahan", during the World War II. On June 26, 2019, the music video of "Romance" was released, which was directed by Cheng Wei-hao, and it features Taiwanese actors Rhydian Vaughan and Bamboo Chen. On December 16, 2020, Tsai released the music video of "Sweet Guilty Pleasure", which was directed by Leo Liao. With a budget of NT$12 million, it was inspired by the documentary film, The Girl Who Talked to Dolphins.

Touring 

In March 14, 2018, Tsai attended the Michelin Guide Taipei 2018 Gala Dinner, and she said that she has started to think of ideas for her new concert tour. On May 18, 2019, Tsai said on a music sharing session for the album in Shanghai, China that she would embark on a new concert tour later the year. In August 2019, Apple Daily reported that Tsai has planned to start her new concert tour at Taipei Arena in late December of the year, and Tsai's manager Tom Wang said: "We will announce the good news after confirming the show dates." On September 20, 2019, Tsai announced that her fifth concert tour Ugly Beauty World Tour would start on December 30, 2019. The tour collaborated with the creative production house Squared Division. Tsai said: "This time I hope to break all rules, and bring a crazy sense to everybody", adding that: "This time I want to bring the complete visual effect of my album to the stage, build an incredible 'Ugly Beauty' magic world, and present the classic songs of my 20-year career in a different way, hope my fans feel the diligently of my production team in this 'another dimension'." On November 19, 2019, Tsai flew to Los Angeles to start a 12-day rehearsal with 16 newly selected dancers.

On December 31, 2019, China Times reported that the Taipei dates of the tour costed NT$246 million, including NT$90 million of stage props design and NT$20 of six video interludes, becoming the concert with the highest cost at Taipei Arena in history. Writing for United Daily News, Tso Kuang-ping said: "There are not many singers who can make such large-scale singing and dancing performance in the C-pop industry. Jolin Tsai is definitely second to none, but she has produced a set of work of a higher standard than expected. From everyone's reaction and word of mouth, there is no doubt about the good reviews." Since January 2020, a series of showing dates were successively cancelled due to the COVID-19 pandemic. On January 7, 2022, all the China shows were cancelled due to the pandemic. On October 13, 2022, Tsai announced six final dates in Taipei, Taiwan began on December 31, 2022. Due to the COVID-19 pandemic, the tour only held 23 shows in 2 cities in Taiwan within three years, it cost a total of NT$400 million, and it grossed a total of NT$680 million from 250,000 attendance.

Critical reception 

Upon its release, the album received positive critical reviews. Golden Melody Awards commented: "Tsai faced her own pain and ridicule from outside through the album, and encourages everyone to love their bodies and dance, to heal their inner pain with upbeat dance songs. It has unique narrative angle and style among last year's albums." The Chinese Musicians Exchange Association commented: "The album is well made, and her singing is comfortable and enjoyable, not only expressed her reflection on life, but also set the concept based on her achievements over the years, there is full of ambition and creativity, which is worthy of her diva status." MuuMuse writer Bradley Stern called the album "marks the grand return of Tsai after four long years since 2014's Play". Writing for Everything Is Noise, Billie Helton described: "Ugly Beauty is a great pop album that does a lot of different things to keep you interested. It is another example of just how good Jolin Tsai is after twenty years, and shows what a treasure the singer is to still be able to produce such diverse music." Writing for Sina Weibo, Ruili Xiurui and Zou Xiaoying praised the album. Ruili Xiurui felt the album "elevated the altitude of audience's aesthetic appreciation". Zou Xiaoying described the album as "a new personal milestone to Tsai", adding that: "It focuses on narrative and keeps up with international trend." PlayMusic gave the album 4.5 out of 5 stars, and it described it was "a masterpiece inspired by her exploration to the good and bad things in the past."

QQ Music gave the album 4 out of 5 stars and listed it as one of the top 60 albums of 2018, and it wrote that it was "a fine production that outruns the rest of the C-pop albums", adding that: "The album is a 'grand finale' to her 'self-exploring' stage of career since 2010's Myself. It starts with world-class dance music production to reveal confidence, and ends with emotional expression to accept imperfection." Taiwan's GQ listed the album as one of the top 12 C-pop albums of 2018, reasoning that: "It embraces many years of criticisms that being said to her, and she fights back beautifully." The Beijing News listed the album as one of top 10 C-pop albums of 2018, and it commented that the album "explores inner and outside worlds, objects repetitious aesthetics and values, and appears continuously growing musical ideas and accomplishment." Southern Metropolis Daily and CRI Online Japan both listed the album as the number one of top 10 C-pop albums of 2018. Punchline listed the album as the number three of top 10 C-pop albums of 2018. Hit FM listed the album as one of top 10 albums of 2018.

Accolades 
On March 25, 2019, Tsai won an Chinese Top Ten Music Award for Best Female Singer (Hong Kong/Taiwan). On May 12, 2019, the Chinese Musicians Exchange Association awarded the album Top 10 Albums, and "Womxnly" won Top 10 Singles. On May 15, 2019, the nominees of the 30th Golden Melody Awards were announced, the album received a total seven nominations, and it is one of the two albums that received the most nominations in the year. The album was nominated for Album of the Year, Best Mandarin Album, and Best Vocal Recording Album, "Womxnly" was nominated for Song of the Year, the music video of "Ugly Beauty" was nominated for Best Music Video, Tsai was nominated for Best Female Mandarin Singer, and Tsai together with Starr Chen were nominated for Best Single Producer for "Ugly Beauty". On June 2, 2019, the album won a Hito Music Award for Most Weeks at Number One Album, "Ugly Beauty" won Top 10 Songs and Hit FM Top 100 Number One Song, and Tsai won for Best Female Singer.

On June 26, 2019, the album won a Golden Melody Award for Album of the Year, and "Womxnly" won Song of the Year. On July 31, 2019, the album won CMIC Music Awards for Best Pop Album and Best Pop Performance, "Ugly Beauty" won Best Music Arrangement and Best Single Production, and the music video of "Ugly Beauty" won Best Music Video. On August 30, 2019, the album won a Global Chinese Pop Chart Award for Best Album (Hong Kong/Taiwan/Overseas), "Ugly Beauty" won Top Songs, and Tsai won Favorite Female Singer (Hong Kong/Taiwan/Overseas). On December 4, 2019, Starr Chen, Howe Chen, and Razor Chiang won an Mnet Asian Music Award for Best Producer of the Year, and Kiel Tutin won Best Choreographer of the Year for the choreography in the music video of "Womxnly". On December 14, 2019, she won Migu Music Awards for Favorite Female Singer (Hong Kong/Taiwan) and Top Appealing Female Singer, and "Ugly Beauty" won Top 10 Songs. On January 18, 2020, Tsai won a KKBox Music Award for Top 10 Singers. On July 15, 2020, the music video of "Lady in Red" was nominated for Best Music Video at the 31st Golden Melody Awards.

Track listing

Personnel 

Song #1
 Razor Chiang – arranger, vocal effect arrangement,  vocal effect
Jolin Tsai – vocal effect
 Jansen Chen – recording engineer
 Luca Pretolesi – mixing engineer
 Andy Lin – mixing assistant engineer

Song #2
 Chen I-ju - lyrics assistant
 Razor Chiang – arranger, backing vocal arranger
 Jolin Tsai – backing vocals
 AJ Chen – recording engineer
 Luca Pretolesi – mixing engineer
 Andy Lin – mixing assistant engineer

Song #3
 A-Hao – executive producer
 Starr Chen – arranger
 Paula Ma – backing vocal arranger, backing vocals
 Jolin Tsai – backing vocals
 Jansen Chen – backing vocal recording engineer, recording engineer
 AJ Chen – recording engineer
 Luca Pretolesi – mixing engineer
 Scott Banks – mixing assistant engineer
 Andy Lin – mixing assistant engineer

Song #4
 A-Hao – executive producer, arranger
 Starr Chen – arranger
 CYH – xylophone
 Parungrung – electric guitar
 Chang Chung-lin – acoustic guitar
 Fumi – bass
 Jansen Chen – recording engineer
 Luca Pretolesi – mixing engineer
 Andy Lin – mixing assistant engineer

Song #5
 Lil Pan – executive producer, piano
 Starr Chen – arranger
 Razor Chiang – arranger
 Morrison Ma – backing vocal arranger
 Jolin Tsai – backing vocal
 Jansen Chen – recording engineer
 AJ Chen – recording engineer
 Luca Pretolesi – mixing engineer
 Andy Lin – mixing assistant engineer

Song #6
 Lil Pan – executive producer
 Starr Chen – arranger
 Morrison Ma – arranger
 Parungrung – electric guitar
 Jansen Chen – recording engineer
 AJ Chen – recording engineer
 Zachary Lin – guitar recording engineer
 Luca Pretolesi – mixing engineer
 Scott Banks – mixing assistant engineer
 Andy Lin – mixing assistant engineer

Song #7
 Howe Chen – arranger, synth, piano, backing vocals arrangement
 Dato Chang – piano
 Zooey Wonder – backing vocals arrangement, producer assistant
 AJ Chen – vocals recording engineer
 Micky Yang – piano recording engineer
 Tsai Chou-han – recording assistant
 Phil Tan – mixing engineer
 Bill Zimmerman – mixing assistant

Song #8
 Howe Chen – arranger, guitar, mellotron, bass recording engineer
 Xiao Yu – arranger, mellotron, backing vocal arrangement, backing vocals
 Dawson Chien – arranger, bass, synth bass
 Dato Chang – piano
 Alibula Jiang – drum
 Penny Pan – backing vocals arrangement
 Jolin Tsai – backing vocals
 Tien Ya-hsin – string arrangement
 Shuon Tsai – first violin
 Nick Chen – first violin
 Lo Ssu-yun – first violin
 Lu Szu-chien – second violin
 Ju Yi-ning – second violin
 Nala Huang – second violin
 Weapon Gan – viola
 Wayne Mau – viola
 Hang Liu – cello
 Micky Yang – strings recording engineer
 Jason Hsu – strings assistant engineer
 Yeh Yu-hsuan – vocals recording engineer, piano recording engineer
 Mimi Tang – vocals recording engineer, piano recording engineer
 Chief Wang – drums recording engineer
 Tsai Chou-han – drums recording engineer
 Ziya Huang – mixing engineer
 Zooey Wonder – producer assistant

Song #9
 Øzi – vocals producer, backing vocal arranger
 Razor Chiang – vocals producer
 A-Hao – executive producer, arranger
 Starr Chen – arranger
 Jolin Tsai – backing vocals 
 Parungrung – electric guitar
 Zell Huang – bass
 Chief Wang – recording engineer
 AJ Chen – recording engineer
 Jansen Chen – backing vocal recording engineer
 Luca Pretolesi – mixing engineer
 Andy Lin – mixing assistant engineer

Song #10
 A-Hao – executive producer, arranger
 Starr Chen – arranger
 Jansen Chen – recording engineer
 AJ Chen – recording engineer

Song #11
 Huang Shao-yung – arranger
 Howe Chen – remix
 Hsu Yu-ying – piano
 Penny Pan – backing vocals arrangement
 Jolin Tsai – backing vocal
 Yeh Yu-hsuan – recording engineer
 Phil Tan – mixing engineer
 Bill Zimmerman – mixing assistant
 Zooey Wonder – producer assistant

Release history

References

External links 
 
 

2018 albums
Jolin Tsai albums
Sony Music Taiwan albums